is a 1961 Japanese drama film directed by Mikio Naruse.

Plot
Miho, mistress of married professor Keijiro, has been managing the Ginza bar owned by him and his wife Ayako for years, hoping that some day she might be made the owner as appreciation for her efforts. Instead, Ayako mortgages the bar for a new acquisition, leading to a conflict between the women. Keijiro avoids taking sides, continuing his affair with Miho. Encouraged by friends, Miho hires lawyer Minami to claim a severance pay. When her hope to win the case fades, she decides to fight for custody of Keijiro's children Hiroko and Susumu, who are her natural children, raised by Keijiro and the infertile Ayako as their own. In a final confrontation between Keijiro, Ayako and Miho, the children learn that Miho, who had always been introduced to them as their aunt, is their true mother. Hiroko scolds the adults for their insincerity, refusing to get involved in their schemes. Some time later, Hiroko has moved in with a student friend, disappointed with her parents. Miho, compensated with a small sum, plans to open a street food shop, while Ayako contemplates a divorce.

Cast
 Hideko Takamine as Miho Nishigaki
 Masayuki Mori as Keijiro Kouno
 Chikage Awashima as Ayako Kouno
 Yuriko Hoshi as Hiroko Kouno
 Kenzaburō Ōsawa as Susumu Kouno
 Tatsuya Nakadai as Minami
 Chōko Iida as Nishigaki Shino, Miho's grandmother
 Keiko Awaji as Fukuko
 Chieko Nakakita as Toshiko Furuya
 Nobuo Nakamura as Kimura
 Kumi Mizuno as Ruriko
 Chieko Seki as Toshibo

Production and release
The screenplay for As a Wife, As a Woman was inspired by an actual court case. The film was released in Japan on May 30, 1961 and in the U.S. in a subtitled version in March 1962. It was presented again in the U.S. as part of a 25 films Naruse retrospective in 1985, organised by the Kawakita Memorial Film Institute and film scholar Audie Bock.

References

External links
 

1961 films
1961 drama films
Japanese drama films
Films directed by Mikio Naruse
Toho films
1960s Japanese films